Sir Mervyn Brown  (born 24 September 1923) is a British retired ambassador and historian of Madagascar.

Career
Brown was educated at Murton, where his parents lived, then Ryhope Grammar School and St John's College, Oxford. He served with the Royal Artillery 1942–45 and joined the Diplomatic Service in 1949. After serving at Buenos Aires and at the UK mission to the United Nations in New York, in 1960 he was appointed consul in Vientiane, Laos, and deputy to the ambassador (John Addis). He later wrote a memoir of his experience of the Laotian Civil War, including a month spent as a prisoner of the Pathet Lao.

Brown was Ambassador to Madagascar 1967–70, High Commissioner to Tanzania and concurrently Ambassador to Madagascar (this time non-resident) 1975–78, and High Commissioner to Nigeria and concurrently Ambassador to Benin 1979–83.

He was knighted KCMG in the 1981 New Year Honours. He is an Officier of the Ordre National of Madagascar. He is a patron of the charity Money for Madagascar.

Publications
Madagascar Rediscovered: A History from Early Times to Independence, 1978. 
A History of Madagascar, 1995. 
War in Shangri-La: A Memoir of Civil War in Laos, 2001.

References

BROWN, Sir Mervyn, Who's Who 2016, A & C Black, 2016 (online edition, Oxford University Press, 2015)

External links
Interview with Sir Mervyn Brown & transcript, British Diplomatic Oral History Programme, Churchill College, Cambridge, 1996

1923 births
Living people
Alumni of St John's College, Oxford
Royal Artillery officers
British Army personnel of World War II
Ambassadors of the United Kingdom to Madagascar
High Commissioners of the United Kingdom to Tanzania
High Commissioners of the United Kingdom to Nigeria
Ambassadors of the United Kingdom to Benin
Knights Commander of the Order of St Michael and St George
Officers of the Order of the British Empire
British male writers
20th-century British historians
British expatriates in the United States
British expatriates in Argentina
British expatriates in Laos
British people imprisoned abroad
Prisoners and detainees of Laos